Higashide (written: 東出) is a Japanese surname. Notable people with the surname include:

, Japanese baseball player
, Japanese actress

Japanese-language surnames